Tom Baack (born 13 March 1999) is a German professional footballer who plays as a centre-back for SC Verl.

Career
Baack made his professional debut for VfL Bochum on 5 October 2018 in the 2. Bundesliga, coming on as a substitute in the 90+4th minute for Tom Weilandt in the 1–0 home win against Arminia Bielefeld.

Career statistics

References

External links
 
 
 

1999 births
Living people
Footballers from Essen
German footballers
Germany youth international footballers
Association football central defenders
VfL Bochum players
SSV Jahn Regensburg players
SC Verl players
2. Bundesliga players
3. Liga players